Les Roses de Mon Silence (English: The Roses of My Silence), is a 2013 album recorded by French singer-songwriter Grégoire, his third.

Track listing
All tracks written by Grégoire Boissenot.

Charts

Weekly charts

Year-end charts

References

2013 albums
Grégoire (musician) albums
French-language albums
Warner Music France albums
My Major Company albums